Mats Hedén (born 20 May 1976) is a Swedish former professional footballer who played as a defender for Västra Frölunda and BK Häcken in the Allsvenskan.

References

1976 births
Living people
Swedish footballers
Västra Frölunda IF players
BK Häcken players
Allsvenskan players
Association football defenders